The 1987 World Orienteering Championships, the 12th World Orienteering Championships, were held in Gérardmer, France, 3–5 September 1987.

The championships had four events; individual contests for men and women, and relays for men and women.

Medalists

References 

World Orienteering Championships
World Orienteering Championships
International sports competitions hosted by France
World Orienteering Championships
Orienteering in Europe